The following is a listing of the documentation available for the former Defense Depot Ogden, Utah, through the public-domain Historic American Engineering Record (HAER). These records document the historical purposes, architectural features, and structure composition of the buildings of the military base, along with many images of individual buildings.

Historic American Engineering Record in Utah